Minettia lupulina is a species of fly in the family Lauxaniidae.

References

Further reading

External links

 

Lauxaniidae
Insects described in 1787